Baisnabnagar Assembly constituency is an assembly constituency in Malda district in the Indian state of West Bengal.

Overview
As per orders of the Delimitation Commission, No. 54 Baisnabnagar Assembly constituency covers Kaliachak III community development block.

Baisnabnagar Assembly constituency is part of No. 8 Maldaha Dakshin (Lok Sabha constituency).

Members of Legislative Assembly

For MLAs from the area in previous years see Kaliachak Assembly constituency

Election results

2021

2016
In the 2016 election, Swadhin Kumar Sarkar of the BJP defeated Azizul Haque of the INC-CPI(M) alliance.

2011
In the 2011 election, Ishaque Khan Chowdhury of Congress defeated his nearest rival Biswanath Ghosh of CPI(M).

References

Assembly constituencies of West Bengal
Politics of Malda district
2011 establishments in West Bengal
Constituencies established in 2011